A list of films produced by the Marathi language film industry based in Maharashtra in the year 1927.

1927 Releases
A list of Marathi films released in 1927.

References

External links
Gomolo - 

Lists of 1927 films by country or language
1927
1927 in Indian cinema